Piletocera violascens is a moth in the family Crambidae. It was described by George Hampson in 1917. It is found in Papua New Guinea.

References

V
Endemic fauna of Papua New Guinea
Moths of Papua New Guinea
Moths described in 1917
Taxa named by George Hampson